Hearts of the West may refer to:

 Hearts of the West (1925 film)
 Hearts of the West (1975 film)
 Hearts of the West, a 1995 romantic novel by Elizabeth Lambert